The Kryevidhi Wind Farm is an under construction wind power project in Albania. It will have 75 individual wind turbines with a nominal output of around 2 MW which will deliver up to 150 MW of power, enough to power over 100,250 homes, with a capital investment required of approximately US$300 million.

References

External links

Wind farms in Albania
Proposed wind farms
Proposed renewable energy power stations in Albania